The Europe Sails Excel is an Austrian high-wing, single-place, hang glider that was designed and produced by Europe Sails.

Design and development

The aircraft is made from aluminum tubing, with the wing covered in Dacron sailcloth. The design was certified as DHV class 2-3 and sold for €3074 in 2003.

Specifications (Excel 146)

References

Hang gliders